{{DISPLAYTITLE:C20H12}}
The molecular formula C20H12 may refer to:

 Benzofluoranthene
 Benzo[a]fluoranthene
 Benzo[b]fluoranthene (Benz[e]acephenanthrylene)
 Benzo[j]fluoranthene
 Benzo[k]fluoranthene
 Benzopyrene
 Benzo[a]pyrene
 Benzo[e]pyrene
 Perylene